Ettampitiya is a small town in Sri Lanka. It is located in the Badulla District, Uva Province.

Religion
 Ettampitiya Sri Neegrodarama Temple

Education
 Ettampitiya Central College
 Ettampitiya Hindu College
 Ettampitiya National School

Attractions
 Gerandi Ella Falls
 Kotugodella fort (ruins)

See also
Towns in Uva

References

External links

Towns in Badulla District